Vice-admiral Sir Roy Thomas Newman,  (born 8 September 1936) is a former Royal Navy officer who became Flag Officer, Plymouth.

Naval career
Educated at Queen Elizabeth's Grammar School in Barnet, Newman joined the Royal Navy in 1954. He became Commanding Officer of the frigate  before taking over the submarine school  in 1981. He became the Commanding Officer of the frigate  as well as Captain of the 7th Frigate Squadron and was involved in the evacuation of British troops from Lebanon in 1984. He was appointed Director of Naval Warfare at the Ministry of Defence in 1986, Flag Officer Sea Training in 1988 and Deputy Commander-in-Chief Fleet in 1990. After serving as Naval Deputy to the Joint Commander for Operation Granby in 1991, he was appointed Flag Officer, Plymouth and Admiral Superintendent at Devonport in 1992, before retiring in 1996.

In retirement Newman became Deputy Lieutenant of Hampshire.

References

|-

|-

1936 births
Living people
Royal Navy vice admirals
Knights Commander of the Order of the Bath
Deputy Lieutenants of Hampshire